József Csuhay (born 12 July 1957) is a Hungarian retired footballer who played as a defender.

During his club career he played for Videoton FC Fehérvár, including both legs of the 1985 UEFA Cup Final, where they lost to Real Madrid 1–3 on aggregate. He took part in both the 1982 FIFA World Cup and the 1986 FIFA World Cup for the Hungary national football team.

References

1957 births
Living people
Hungarian footballers
Hungary international footballers
1982 FIFA World Cup players
1986 FIFA World Cup players
Fehérvár FC players
Sportspeople from Eger
Association football defenders